Stanley Arthur Trick, known as Stan Trick (3 June 1884 – 11 February 1958) was an English cricketer for Essex. Playing over five sporadic appearances between 1905 and 1919, he was a middle-order right-hand batsman. He had only modest success, with 69 runs at a batting average of only 7.66, before going on to become a colliery agent.

Notes

External links
 

1884 births
1958 deaths
People from Stoke Newington
People educated at Merchant Taylors' School, Northwood
English cricketers
Essex cricketers